The former Merck & Co. headquarters building is a modernist office building located in the Whitehouse Station section of Readington Township, New Jersey, United States.  It was designed by Kevin Roche John Dinkeloo and Associates, LLC in the late 1980s for the Merck & Co. pharmaceutical company.  Over the years it became well known for its various environmentally friendly features.

On October 9, 2012, Merck & Co. announced that starting in 2014 it would move its headquarters to the Schering-Plough site (formerly belonging to Ciba, Ciba-Geigy and Novartis) in Summit, New Jersey, acquired in the November  2009 acquisition of Schering, and planned to close the Whitehouse Station headquarters building upon completion of the move in 2015. In October, 2013 Merck & Co. reversed course and said its headquarters would move to Kenilworth, New Jersey and that the 88-acre Summit campus would be sold after being vacated on Dec. 31, 2014.

On July 12, 2018, UNICOM Global announced that their division UNICOM Corporation had signed an agreement with Merck & Co. to purchase the entire Merck property at Whitehouse Station, with the acquisition expected to close in October, 2018. The completion of the acquisition was announced on October 1, 2018. The property was renamed UNICOM Science and Technology Park (USTP).

Building history
Constructed in 1990 as a home for the headquarters staff of Merck & Co., the building is most recognizable for its hexagon shape and its nature setting. Further, Merck & Co. placed the parking structure underground and created a temporary nursery on-site for the trees removed during construction, in order to make the facility a "corporate cottage in the woods". The initial site plan foresaw the subsequent addition of two buildings to create a grid of three connected hexagons, however, after a change in management, it was indicated that further construction in the original style would not occur. Instead a conventional office block was built adjacent to it known as "Whitehouse Station West".

In the center of the building there is a park with a small lawned sitting area containing a statue given by Merck Germany.

Prior to moving to this location, the Merck & Co. headquarters was located in Rahway, New Jersey.  The Whitehouse Station campus is located on an old dairy farm and the surrounding area is known as a more suburban/rural setting than the area around the Rahway campus. As a result, Merck & Co. included amenities such as on-site child-care, a fitness center, baseball fields, and a medical services center for employees.

Solar initiative
Among the largest installations at a corporate headquarters, the system is also the largest ground-mounted solar power tracking system east of the Mississippi River. In all, it will provide 7% of the site's power and is expected to "reduce carbon dioxide emissions by more than 1,300 tons per year."

References

Office buildings completed in 1990
Buildings and structures in Hunterdon County, New Jersey
Headquarters in the United States
Merck & Co.
Modernist architecture in New Jersey
Readington Township, New Jersey
Roche-Dinkeloo buildings
1990 establishments in New Jersey